Silke Gnad, also known as Silke Fittinger (born 20 November 1966), is a German former handball player. She participated at the 1992 Summer Olympics, where the German national team placed fourteenth.

References 
 Profile at sports-reference.com

1966 births
Living people
People from Stralsund
People from Bezirk Rostock
German female handball players
Sportspeople from Mecklenburg-Western Pomerania
Olympic handball players of Germany
Handball players at the 1992 Summer Olympics
20th-century German women